Sigurdur Helgason (born 30 September 1927; Icelandic: Sigurður) is an Icelandic mathematician whose research has been devoted to the geometry and analysis on symmetric spaces. In particular, he has used new integral geometric methods to establish fundamental existence theorems for differential equations on symmetric spaces as well as some new results on the representations of their isometry groups. He also introduced a Fourier transform on these spaces and proved the principal theorems for this
transform, the inversion formula, the Plancherel theorem and the analog of the Paley–Wiener theorem.

He was born in Akureyri, Iceland. In 1954, he earned a PhD from Princeton University under Salomon Bochner. Since 1965, Helgason has been a professor of mathematics at the Massachusetts Institute of Technology.

He was winner of the 1988 Leroy P. Steele Prize for Seminal Contributions for his books Groups and Geometric Analysis and Differential Geometry, Lie Groups and Symmetric Spaces. This was followed by the 2008 book  Geometric Analysis on Symmetric Spaces. On May 31, 1996 Helgason received an honorary doctorate from the Faculty of 
Science and Technology at Uppsala University, Sweden. 

He has been a fellow of the American Academy of Arts and Sciences since 1970. In 2012, he became a fellow of the American Mathematical Society.

Selected works

Articles

Books
Differential geometry and symmetric spaces. Academic Press 1962, AMS 2001
Analysis on Lie groups and homogeneous spaces. AMS 1972
Differential geometry, Lie groups and symmetric spaces. Academic Press 1978, 7th edn. 1995
The Radon Transform. Birkhäuser, 1980, 2nd edn. 1999
Topics in harmonic analysis on homogeneous spaces. Birkhäuser 1981
Groups and geometric analysis: integral geometry, invariant differential operators and spherical functions. Academic Press 1984,  AMS 1994
Geometric analysis on symmetric spaces. AMS 1994, 2nd. edn. 2008

References

Sources

External links

Sigurdur Helgason – Publications – MIT Mathematics

1927 births
Living people
Sigurdur Helgason
Differential geometers
Massachusetts Institute of Technology School of Science faculty
Fellows of the American Mathematical Society
20th-century mathematicians
21st-century mathematicians
Sigurdur Helgason
People from Akureyri
Princeton University alumni